The 2001 Robert Morris Colonials football team represented Robert Morris College, now Robert Morris University, as a member of the Northeast Conference (NEC) during the 2001 NCAA Division I-AA football season. The Colonials were led by 8th-year head coach Joe Walton and played their home games at Moon Stadium on the campus of Moon Area High School.

Schedule

References

Robert Morris
Robert Morris Colonials football seasons
Robert Morris Colonials football